The Clue of the Last Handkerchief is a 1913 Australian film. It was a detective film.

The film was previewed in Sydney in August 1913.

References

Australian silent short films
1913 films
Australian black-and-white films